The 1952 Football Championship of UkrSSR were part of the 1952 Soviet republican football competitions in the Soviet Ukraine.

Qualification group stage

Group 1

Group 2

Group 3

Group 4

Final

Champion title playoff
 FC Metalurh Zaporizhia – FC Chervonyi Styah Mykolaiv 3:0

Promotional playoff
 ODO Kiev – FC Metalurh Zaporizhia 3:0 3:1

References

External links
 1952. Football Championship of the UkrSSR (1952. Первенство УССР.) Luhansk Nash Futbol.
 Group 1: ukr-football.org.ua
 Group 2: ukr-football.org.ua
 Group 3: ukr-football.org.ua
 Group 4: ukr-football.org.ua
 Group 5: ukr-football.org.ua
 Group 6: ukr-football.org.ua
 Final: ukr-football.org.ua

Ukraine
Football Championship of the Ukrainian SSR
Championship